Lord of Shanghai may refer to:

 Lord of Shanghai (TV series), 2015 Hong Kong TV series
 Lord of Shanghai (film), 2017 Chinese film